The war between the warlike communities of Souliotes in Epirus and the local Ottoman ruler, Ali Pasha, in 1803, was the last of a series of conflicts, known as the Souliote Wars, that led, finally, to the capitulation and expulsion of the Souliotes.

Background

During the 500-year reign of the Ottoman Empire, the fierce Souliotes enjoyed an autonomous status, known as the Souliote Confederacy. The Confederacy was established during the 16th century, in the mountains of Thesprotia, near the towns of Paramythia and Parga. The Souliotes established an autonomous confederacy dominating the villages in the remote mountainous areas of Epirus, where they successfully resisted Ottoman rule. At the height of its power, in the second half of the 18th century, the Souliote Confederacy is estimated to have comprised up to 12,000 inhabitants scattered across approximately 60 villages.

Conflict
In 1803, the Sultan asked Ali Pasha to press immediately a planned siege of the Souliotes, after being transmitted information that the Souliotes had procured considerable supplies of munitions from French ships. The Souliotes obtained all of their supplies from Parga, and also acquired support from Europe. Russia and France provided weapons and ammunition to them. For the European powers, the Souliotes were seen as an instrument to weaken the Ottoman Empire. When the British politicians turned to the Ottoman Empire in order to strengthen their forces against Napoleon, the weapons and ammunition supplies were interrupted. Without support from outside and wearied by years of siege, the unity of the Souliot clans began to fray.

The Botsaris family left Souli for political reasons and parleyed with Ali Pasha. The Souliotes remaining in Souli gathered in Saint George's Eastern Orthodox Church and agreed to fight to the death. Among them were no more than 2,000 armed men. The main leaders were Fotos Tzavellas, Dimos Drakos, Tousias Zervas, Koutzonikas, Gogkas Danglis, Yiannakis Sehos, Fotomaras, Tzavaras, Veikos, Panou, Zigouris Diamadis, and Giorgos Bousbos. Amazingly, these Souliotes won all the ensuing decisive battles and forced Ali Pasha to build castles in neighboring villages so as to prepare himself for a long siege.

On 3 September 1803, the troops of Ali Pasha, led by his son Veli Pasha, gained possessions of the village of Kakosuli, after the treachery of a Souliote named Pylios Gousis. Gousis admitted 200 soldiers into his house after being paid for that by Veli Pasha, the second son of Ali. Gousis himself said that it was not the money but his wish to save his son, who  was being held captive by Ali Pasha. The Souliotes withdrew to the fortresses of Kiafa and Kughi, where they fought their last battle on 7 December 1803.

The military chief of the Souliotes was the priest Samuel, who was in charge of the magazines on Kungi, leading 300 families in the battle. One of the two hills in the region, called Bira (Kiafa) was abandoned by the clan of Zervas, leaving the other hill, Kughi, as the only stronghold of the Souliotes. Ali Pasha`s aim was not only to expel the Souliotes, but also to capture their leaders and hold them hostage. Therefore, he ordered his son Veli to come to an agreement, a treaty, with Foto Tzavela, the father of Kitsos Tzavelas, later Prime Minister of Greece. On 12 December 1803, Veli Pasha and Foto Tzavela signed a capitulation treaty which included a provision that the main pharas of the Souliotes, including those of Drakos and Zervas, to relocate to Parga.

In an act of treachery that had become familiar to the Souliotes, Ali Pasha planned to seize them as hostages on the road to Parga. Ali's soldiers were ordered to set up an ambush on the road. However, Ali's own troops were moved to countermand his orders. Some Muslim beys of Paramythia and Amartoli, members of Veli's army, hearing of this plan, informed the Souliotes, who changed their itinerary at the last minute and managed to survive. The Zervas clan subsequently made its way to Messinia in the Peloponnese peninsula of Greece, where they established the village they named Romiri and the Turks, ironically, named Veli. There, the priest Lambros Zervas, known as Papa Lambros, continued to gather arms for the Greek Revolution, sending guns to his brother, Diamantis Zervas, a leader in the Greek Revolutionary Army.

Meanwhile, the priest Samuel refused to trust the capitulation treaty with Ali, so on the hill of Kungi, he withdrew to the magazine filled with munitions and declared that no infidel would employ these, which were entrusted to his care, against Christians. He then lit the magazine, causing an enormous explosion and dying a martyr.

Aftermath

Zalongo incident
The Souliotes who signed an agreement with Ali Pasha that ensured their continued life in Souli suffered the worst fate. They withdrew to the mountain of Zalongo, under the promise of protection by the pasha; however, as soon as Ali gained Kiafa, he ordered his troops to seize and murder them. About 150 men and women were seized and enslaved by Ali and 25 were killed. During this battle, 22 women and six men decided to die rather than to fall into the hands of Ali.

Over 50 women, holding their children in their arms, danced on the cliff at Zalongo. One by one, reaching the leading side of the circle dance, they threw themselves over the cliff. The bodies of four children were reported to be found below, perhaps having been saved by the corpses of those who fell before--but saved for the inevitable suffering at the hands of the Ottomans. The story of the mass suicide at Zalongo soon became known in the whole region and throughout Europe.

In another part of Epirus, a group of no more than 200 Souliotes managed to defend themselves. After numerous battles, a few families managed to retreat to Parga. This “disgrace” could not be tolerated by Ali. He ordered his troops to kill every Souliote family that lived dispersed in his pashalik, and he sent the seventy Souliote families who had surrendered to him to inhabit the most desolate spots in his pashalik.

The eviction and the catastrophe made Souliotes flee to Corfu. In 1820, they reached an agreement with Ali Pasha, and turned back to their homeland, fighting this time side-by-side with Ali against the Ottoman Empire. Nevertheless, in no more than a year, Souliotes became part of the Greek War of Independence, thus leaving their land forever.

Legacy

According to the legend, the women of Zalongo, holding their children in their arms, went to the cliff at Zalongo and, while singing and dancing the syrtos, jumped over the precipice one after another. The incident soon became known in Europe. At the Salon of 1827, a French artist named Ary Scheffer exhibited two Romantic paintings, one of which was entitled Les Femmes souliotes ("The Souliot Women"). Today, a monument on the site of Mount Zalongo above village Kamarina (in which the Drakos family is still represented) and above Kassope commemorates their sacrifice. There is also a popular dance-song about the event, which is known and still is danced in Greece today.

See also
Moscho Tzavela
Kitsos Botsaris
Ottoman Greece

References

Sources

Souliotes
Ottoman Epirus
Conflicts in 1803
Wars involving the Ottoman Empire
Ali Pasha of Ioannina
1803 in the Ottoman Empire
19th century in Greece